The 2018 Abu Dhabi Grand Prix (formally known as the Formula 1 2018 Etihad Airways Abu Dhabi Grand Prix) was a Formula One motor race held on 25 November 2018 at the Yas Marina Circuit in Abu Dhabi, United Arab Emirates. The race was the twenty first and final round of the 2018 Formula One World Championship and marked the tenth running of the Abu Dhabi Grand Prix and the tenth time that the race has been run as a World Championship event since the inaugural event in 2009.  The race was the last to be officiated by Charlie Whiting as race director as he would die shortly before the next race was held.

Report

Background
McLaren announced they would be using a special one-off livery to celebrate the last race of Fernando Alonso, who had announced he would not be racing in Formula One in 2019 (he eventually returned in ). This was the first time McLaren had run a special livery since the 1986 Portuguese Grand Prix.  McLaren also invited the family of seven time Monster Energy NASCAR Cup Series Champion Jimmie Johnson to the race.  Johnson and his family watched the race from the McLaren garage.

Title standings before the race 
Prior to the race, Lewis Hamilton had already secured the 2018 World Drivers' Championship title, while his team, Mercedes, had secured the 2018 World Constructors' Championship title. Lewis Hamilton claimed his fifth World Drivers' title at the 2018 Mexican Grand Prix; following the Brazilian Grand Prix he led Sebastian Vettel by 81 points with Kimi Räikkönen being third, a further 51 points behind. In the World Constructors' Championship, Mercedes led Ferrari by 67 points with only one race remaining in the season, with Red Bull Racing being third in the standings.

Practice 
Max Verstappen was fastest in first practice, Valtteri Bottas was fastest in second practice and Lewis Hamilton was fastest in third practice.

Qualifying 
Lewis Hamilton set the fastest time in qualifying followed by Mercedes teammate Valtteri Bottas and the Ferrari of Sebastian Vettel.

Race 
Hamilton won the race from pole position with Vettel and Max Verstappen completing the podium. On the first lap at turn 9 Nico Hülkenberg overtook Romain Grosjean at turn 8 at the end of the back straight.  Grosjean was pushed off the track by the move but tried to still make turn 9 alongside Hülkenberg.  Not realizing that Grosjean was still on his inside, Hülkenberg attempted to take the normal line through turn 9 and his rear right tire ran over Grosjean's front left.  This caused the Renault R.S.18 to flip and barrel roll into the barriers to the left of turn 9, thus sending the race into a safety car situation, the first such instance in the Abu Dhabi Grand Prix since 2012.

Post race 
After the race had been completed Alonso celebrated the end of his career by performing doughnuts on the pit straight alongside Lewis Hamilton and Sebastian Vettel, the other two World Champions who completed the race (Kimi Räikkönen had retired from the race.)  Jimmie Johnson congratulated Alonso on his career.  The two would later exchange their respective cars in a car swap at Bahrain International Circuit.

Classification

Qualifying

Race 

Notes
  – Fernando Alonso received three five-second penalties for leaving the track and gaining an advantage. Esteban Ocon received one five-second penalty for the same offence.

Final Championship standings 

Drivers' Championship standings

Constructors' Championship standings

 Note: Only the top five positions are included for both sets of standings.
 Bold text indicates the 2018 World Champions.

See also 
 2018 Yas Island Formula 2 round
 2018 Yas Marina GP3 Series round

References

External links

 Abu Dhabi Grand Prix 2018 – News Articles

Abu Dhabi Grand Prix
Abu Dhabi Grand Prix
Abu Dhabi Grand Prix
Abu Dhabi Grand Prix